Phoronis emigi is a species of marine horseshoe worm in the phylum Phoronida. It is found off the coast of Japan and is morphologically similar to Phoronis psammophila.

References

Phoronids
Animals described in 2014